Hampton High School is a high school in Hampton, Tennessee.

History 
The school was originally built during the 1940s. The elementary school was destroyed by a fire in October 1959. A new high school was built during 1961 thru 1963.  The first students went to the new high school in late 1963. The first class of students to go all four years to this new school graduated in 1967.  The old high school became the elementary school.  Both buildings are still in use.  Current sports teams include boys' and girls' basketball, football, baseball, softball, soccer, and marching band.

Marching Band 
The Hampton High School Bulldog Band was founded in 1999 and a band room was built in 2001. Recent directors include Travis Skeen, Onsby Rose, Bryan Angel, and Jamie Davidson, and current Director, Zak Austin. Typically the Bulldog Band consists of 25 to 30 members and relies heavily on community support The band is classified as 1A and competes yearly in Northeast Tennessee and Southwest Virginia.

References

External links
School website

Public high schools in Tennessee
Schools in Carter County, Tennessee
Hampton, Tennessee
1940s establishments in Tennessee